Ring Master is a 2014 Indian Malayalam-language comedy film written and directed by Rafi, starring Dileep in the role of an animal trainer in circus. Keerthy Suresh, Honey Rose, Vijayaraghavan, Kalabhavan Shajohn, Suraj Venjaramoodu, and Guinness Pakru play the other characters. The film was released on 12 April 2014 to positive response. The film was a commercial success at the box office.

Plot
The movie starts with Prince, who is working as dog trainer in a dog clinic owned by his friend Dr. Muthu, and Peter is filming a documentary of the clinic. His life changes when an affluent rich lady Elizabeth and her female dog Lisa enters his life. Elizabeth appoints Prince as a caretaker for her dogs on the condition that Lisa, one of her pet should never get pregnant. However, Prince fails at the dire moment, when Toby, the guide dog of visually challenged Karthika mates with Lisa. Things get worse, when Lisa delivers four puppies, but unfortunately she dies in labor, along with three of her kids. Prince names the lone puppy 'Diana', whom he raises with utmost care. Despite a rough start, Prince and Karthika gets along and become close friends. Diana becomes famous after she acts in a movie which marks Peter's directional debut, which eventually becomes a superhit. Later on she does a movie with the actress Diana who had betrayed Prince earlier.

A heartbroken Prince once remembers all about his sweet past with the then student Diana, whose real name was Sarasamma. It was upon her father's request that Prince came up with the new name for his prospective sweetheart. As Diana grew to be talented and a beautiful woman, Prince strived to the fullest to bring her to the silver screen. As fame, followed by a sense of ungratefulness begins to rack in, Diana publicly disowned Prince, which made him an object of heavy ridicule in front of his people. It was that humiliation which pitted Prince to go all out against his former love interest.

Prince, with a huge support of his friends, including Karthika, survives every plot the actress Diana sets against the canine Diana and her master. In the meantime, Elizabeth learns that her dog Lisa was canine Diana's mother, and sues Prince for title of his dog's ownership.

At last, Prince wins the case for keeping the canine Diana, on the grounds of his boundless love towards his dog, while the actress Diana learns the lesson that fame is not everything, and even a dog can outfame a human, when the time is right. In the aftermath that follows, Peter gets married, Dr. Muthu opens a hospital in his own name, and most significantly, Karthika undergoes a successful eye surgery and starts a new life with her guardian angel Prince.

Cast

 Dileep as Prince, a dog trainer at his friend Dr. Muthu's veterinary clinic and owner of the dog Diana
 Keerthy Suresh as Karthika (Karthu), blind lady later becomes the Prince's girlfriend and wife and owner of dog Tobey
 Honey Rose as Sarasamma a.k.a. Diana, Prince's ex-girlfriend and Lady superstar in the film industry 
 Vijayaraghavan as Prince's father
 Kalabhavan Shajohn as Dr. Muthu, a veterinary doctor and Prince's friend
 Aju Varghese as Peter, an aspiring filmmaker
 Rafi as Director Ravishankar
 Abu Salim as Circle Inspector Pramod
 Mohan Jose as Diana's father
 Ranjini as Elizabeth
 Suraj Venjaramoodu as Adv. Shravan, Prince's lawyer
 Sai Kumar as Varghese Ummen / Elizabeth's husband.
 Guinness Pakru as Sathyavel/Bachan Kunju
 Kalabhavan Haneefa as Narayanan
 Anand as Raju, husband of Karthika's eldest sister
 Saju Kodiyan as Ajay, Production controller
 Neena Kurup as Mini / Karthika's sister, Raju's wife
 Nisha Sarang as Sathyavel's wife
 Indulekha as Interviewer
 Ancy as Lady at the animal hospital
 Shiju as Kishore Kumar
 Dinesh Panikker as Interviewer
 Chembil Ashokan as Petcare Driver
 Molly Kannamaly as Paruvamma
 Eloor George as George
 Basil as Diana's bodyguard
 Chali Pala as Chacko
 Sadiq as Cultural Minister
 Mafia Sasi as Stunt Master
 Kollam Thulasi as Opponent Leader
 Janardhanan as Chief Minister
 Sajitha Betti as Nandini,Wife of Kishore Kumar
 Lakshmipriya as Advocate
 Manjusha Sajish as Nurse
 Balachandran Chullikad as Judge
 Anil Murali as Adv. Anil
 Narayanankutty as Doctor
 Augustina Aju as Peter's wife (Cameo)
 Vasanthi

Production
In September 2013 it was reported that Dileep's next comedy film would be Ring Master and that it would be the inaugural venture of Rafi as an independent director after separating from Rafi-Mecartin duo. Dileep was chosen to play the lead role of an animal trainer in the film. He underwent a special training for the same and was trained by animal experts from across the country. Miya was initially cast for one of the lead female role (which was actually done by Keerthy), but she dropped out of the project due to date clashes with her debut Tamil film  and was later replaced by Keerthi Suresh. Keerthi essayed the role of a visually challenged girl in the film. Honey Rose was signed for another lead female role and she stated "My character Diana has negative shades but she is an interesting character".

Box office
Ring Master was a commercial success. In Kerala, the film earned a distributor's share around 6 – 7 crore in 50 days run. The film collected 15,159 from UK box office.

References

External links

2014 films
2010s Malayalam-language films
Films scored by Gopi Sundar